The  is a public university in Hamada, Shimane, Japan. The predecessor of the school was founded in 1993, and it was chartered as a university in 2000.

External links
 Official website 

Educational institutions established in 1993
Public universities in Japan
University of Shimane
1993 establishments in Japan